Victoria Township is one of twenty-one townships in Knox County, Illinois, USA.  As of the 2010 census, its population was 379 and it contained 171 housing units.

Geography

Cities, towns, villages
 Victoria (east half)

Cemeteries
The township contains these five cemeteries: Center Prairie, Etherly, Garret, Salem and Victoria.

Lakes
 Lone Rock Lake
 Lost Lake
 Old Garage Lake
 T Lake

Demographics

School districts
 Rowva Community Unit School District 208
 Williamsfield Community Unit School District 210

Political districts
 Illinois's 18th congressional district
 State House District 74
 State Senate District 37

References
 
 United States Census Bureau 2009 TIGER/Line Shapefiles
 United States National Atlas

External links
 City-Data.com
 Illinois State Archives
 Township Officials of Illinois

Townships in Knox County, Illinois
Galesburg, Illinois micropolitan area
Townships in Illinois